Negishi Racecourse was a horse-racing facility located on the outskirts of Yamate in the treaty port of Yokohama, recognized as the first purpose built European style racecourse in Japan.  The course was operational between 1866 and 1942.

History

The completion of the Negishi Racecourse in 1866 provided the first permanent site for horse racing in Yokohama, replacing a temporary Swamp Ground site at the rear of the Kannai foreign settlement where the first races had been run in 1862. Initially intended as an entertainment venue for the foreign community, the racecourse rapidly became popular with Japanese society; the Emperor Meiji visiting on 14 separate occasions.

After the Great Kantō earthquake, the main grandstand of the course was rebuilt in 1929 to a design by American architect JH Morgan.

Horse racing at the Negishi Racecourse continued until 1942. During wartime, portions of the original site were requisitioned by the military and only later turned into a public park, the U.S. Navy's Negishi Heights housing facility and the location of an equestrian sports museum.

See also
 Horseracing in Japan

References

Horse racing venues in Japan
Sports venues in Yokohama
Defunct sports venues in Japan
Sports venues completed in 1866
1866 establishments in Japan
1942 disestablishments in Japan
Naka-ku, Yokohama